Abdelhadi Kada Benyacine (born August 5, 1990, in Tlemcen) is an Algerian football player who plays for WA Tlemcen in the Algerian Ligue Professionnelle 1.

On May 28, 2010, Kada Benyacine made his senior debut for WA Tlemcen as a 68th-minute substitute in a league match against MC El Eulma.

International career
In 2007, Kada Benyacine was a member of the Algeria national under-20 football team.

References

External links
 
 

1990 births
Algeria youth international footballers
Algerian footballers
Algerian Ligue Professionnelle 1 players
Living people
People from Tlemcen
WA Tlemcen players
USM Bel Abbès players
Algerian Ligue 2 players
GC Mascara players
Association football defenders
21st-century Algerian people